Bryan Alvaréz (born 4 September 1999) is a Costa Rican swimmer. He competed in the men's 50 metre butterfly event at the 2017 World Aquatics Championships. In 2019, he represented Costa Rica at the 2019 World Aquatics Championships held in Gwangju, South Korea.

References

1999 births
Living people
Costa Rican male swimmers
Place of birth missing (living people)
Swimmers at the 2019 Pan American Games
Male butterfly swimmers
Pan American Games competitors for Costa Rica